Charles Rogers Arundell (June 7, 1885 – May 28, 1968) was a judge of the United States Tax Court from 1925 to 1968.

Born in Washington, D.C., Arundell attended public school in the District and received an LL.B. from George Washington University in 1908.

He practiced law in Portland, Oregon, from 1910 to 1915, and served as chief of the Alaskan Field Division in the General Land Office, in charge of public lands of Alaska, from 1916 to 1919. He was a special attorney and assistant solicitor in the Bureau of Internal Revenue of the Treasury Department from 1921 to 1925. He was appointed to the U.S. Board of Tax Appeals (now the Tax Court) on September 1, 1925, and reappointed for three succeeding terms on June 2, 1926, June 2, 1938, and June 2, 1950, respectively. He served as chairman of the U.S. Board of Tax Appeals from 1937 to 1941, and retired August 31, 1955, though he was immediately thereafter recalled to perform further judicial duties.

Arundell married Alice W. Robinson, nee Wright, September 21, 1926, with whom he had one daughter, Elizabeth.

References

1885 births
1968 deaths
George Washington University alumni
Members of the United States Board of Tax Appeals
Judges of the United States Tax Court
United States Article I federal judges appointed by Calvin Coolidge